Maco, officially the Municipality of Maco, is a 1st class municipality in the province of Davao de Oro, Philippines. According to the 2020 census, it has a population of 83,237 people.

It was formerly part of the Municipality of Mabini before becoming an independent municipality on June 17, 1967.

Geography

Climate

Barangays
Maco is politically subdivided into 37 barangays.

Demographics

Economy

Festivals and events
Fiesta ng Maco is celebrated every last Saturday of the month of June honoring "Inahan sa Kanunay'ng Panabang" (Mother of Perpetual Help).

Kaimonan Festival is an annual festival that starts on June 17 to the last Saturday of the same month. Kaimonan is a mansaka term for "thanksgiving".

See also
List of renamed cities and municipalities in the Philippines

References

External links
 Maco Profile at the DTI Cities and Municipalities Competitive Index
 [ Philippine Standard Geographic Code]
Philippine Census Information

Municipalities of Davao de Oro
Establishments by Philippine executive order